Brian Glover (2 April 1934 – 24 July 1997) was an English actor and writer. He worked as a teacher and professional wrestler before commencing an acting career which included films, many roles on British television and work on the stage. His film appearances include Kes (1969), An American Werewolf in London (1981) and Alien 3 (1992).

Described by The New York Times as a "robust character actor" who played "gruff but likable roles", he had a "string of roles playing tough guys and criminals". He once said, "You play to your strengths in this game, and my strength is as a bald-headed, rough-looking Yorkshireman". Glover was also known as the voice of the Tetley tea commercials. The Independent described him upon his death as "one of Britain's best-loved actors".

Early life and wrestling career
Glover was born at the Women's Hospital, Sheffield, West Riding of Yorkshire and he lived in Sheffield until 1937 when his parents moved to Lundwood near Barnsley. His father, Charles Glover, was a wrestler, performing as "the Red Devil". He attended Barnsley Grammar School and the University of Sheffield, where he supplemented his student grant with appearances as a professional wrestler, going under the ring name "Leon Arras the Man From Paris". He adopted that name from a wrestler who didn't turn up to a match one night, for whom Glover stood in. His wrestling style incorporated a lot of comedy, including the catchphrases "ask 'im, ref" and "'ow about that then".

In 1954 he married his first wife Elaine Foster, and became a teacher at the same Barnsley school where he had been a pupil. He taught English and French from 1954 until 1970, some of it at Longcar Central School, Barnsley, where he met Barry Hines who was also teaching there. He managed to combine this with regular performances as "Leon Arras", whose appearances included bouts on World of Sport, and in Paris, Milan, Zurich and Barcelona.

Acting career
Glover's first acting job came playing Mr Sugden, the comically overbearing sports teacher in Ken Loach's film Kes (a job offered to him when Barry Hines, who wrote the film, suggested him to the director). Although untrained, Glover proved to be a skilled and flexible character actor, using techniques learnt during his wrestling career. His large bald head, stocky build, and distinctive voice, with his Yorkshire accent, garnered him many roles as tough guys and criminals.

He played Bottom in A Midsummer Night's Dream (BBC TV, 1981) and had a recurring role in the classic sitcom Porridge as dim-witted prison inmate Cyril Heslop who, when accused of being illiterate, utters the memorable line "I read a book once! Green, it was." He played Quilp in The Old Curiosity Shop, and lent his voice to a number of animated characters, including the "gaffer" of the "Tetley Tea Folk" in a long-running series of television advertisements for Tetley tea, the voice behind the advertising slogan "Bread wi' nowt taken out" for Allinson bread, and the voice of "Big Pig", the mascot for the long-running Now That's What I Call Music! album series, appearing on the TV adverts for Now 3, Now 4 and Now 5. He also appeared in An American Werewolf in London, The First Great Train Robbery, Jabberwocky, Alien 3, Leon the Pig Farmer and as General Douglas in a Bollywood hit 1942: A Love Story. He appeared seven times in Play for Today, in three of them as part of a recurring trio of Yorkshiremen: The Fishing Party, Shakespeare or Bust and Three for the Fancy.

Glover's performance in Kes led to parts at the Royal Court Theatre, London, notably in Lindsay Anderson's The Changing Room (1971). A season with Britain's Royal Shakespeare Company followed, where  his roles included Charles the wrestler (and, drawing on his wrestling experience, the fight arranger) in As You Like It, and a robust Peter in Romeo and Juliet. For the Royal National Theatre he appeared in The Mysteries (as God, creating the world with the help of a real fork-lift truck), Saint Joan and Don Quixote.

In the film Brannigan he claimed to have lost the only fight in his acting career, fighting John Wayne.

His performance in The Mysteries secured additional work in the commercial theatre. The Canterbury Tales ("Chaucer wi' nowt taken owt")(West End) was followed by a return to television and the Play for Today series, both as writer and performer and, in turn, more screen roles. Glover wrote a horror themed episode of Theatre Box called Death Angel, which aired in 1981. He went on to play Lugg, the endearing rogue manservant to Albert Campion in the series Campion, and the role of a crook, Griffiths, in the Doctor Who story Attack of the Cybermen in 1985. He played Edouard Dindon in the original London cast of La Cage aux Folles. In 1991 he starred in the second episode of Bottom, in the episode "Gas", as the perpetually angry neighbour Mr Rottweiler. At the end of his life he acted in John Godber's rugby league comedy Up 'n' Under (1998). He was also the voice for the UNO Upholstery TV adverts in 1995 and 1996.

Glover also wrote over 20 plays and short films. In 1982 he was a guest presenter in series six of Friday Night Saturday Morning, a late-night BBC chat show.

Personal life
Glover was married twice, secondly to television producer Tara Prem, the daughter of TV actor Bakhshi Prem, on 2 October 1996. He had two children, one daughter from his first marriage and one son from his second marriage. In September 1996, Glover developed a brain tumour and underwent an operation for it. The tumour was removed and it appeared he had made a full recovery but it returned in the summer of 1997 and Glover died in his sleep in a London hospital on 24 July 1997. He was buried in Brompton Cemetery, London on 30 July 1997.

Film and television credits 

 Kes (1969) as Mr Sugden
 On the House (1971, TV series) as Bagley
 Paul Temple (1971, TV series) as Waites
 Joy (1972, TV movie) as Extra
 Coronation Street (1972, soap opera) as Fred Henshaw
 Sez Les (1972, TV series)
 A Day Out (1972, TV movie) as Boothroyd
 The Fishing Party (1972, Play for Today) as Art
 ‘’The Frighteners’’ (1972),ep.4 ‘The Minder’
 Thirty-Minute Theatre (1973, TV series) as The Guard
 Whatever Happened to the Likely Lads? (1973, sitcom) as Flint
 The Regiment (1973, TV series) as Sergeant Dyke
 O Lucky Man! (1973) as Plantation foreman / Bassett (Power station guard)
 The Protectors (1973, TV series) as Allen
 Shakespeare or Bust (1973, Play for Today) as Art
 You'll Never Walk Alone (1974, TV short) as Maurice Pouncey
 Porridge (1974,sitcom) as Heslop
 Centre Play (1974, TV series) as Nobby
 Three for the Fancy (1974, Play for Today) as Art
 The Sweeney (1975, TV series) as Moose
 Not On Your Nellie (1975, TV series) .... Battling Bill
 Dixon of Dock Green (1975, TV series) ... Chuck Windell
 Brannigan (1975) .... Jimmy-the-Bet
 Quiller (1975, TV series) .... Sergeant
 Mister Quilp (1975) .... Furnaceman
 Trial by Combat (1976) .... Sidney Gore
 Sweeney! (1977) .... Mac
 Joseph Andrews (1977) .... Gaoler
 Jabberwocky (1977) .... Armourer
 Secret Army (1977, TV series) .... Corporal Emil Schnorr
 The First Great Train Robbery (1978) .... Captain Jimmy
 Absolution (1978) .... First Policeman
 The Famous Five (1978) .... Tiger Dan, circus clown
 Sounding Brass (1980, TV series) .... Horace Gilbert Beswick
 Minder (1980, TV series) .... Yorkie
 An American Werewolf in London (1981) .... Chess Player
 A Midsummer Night's Dream (1981, TV movie) .... Nick Bottom
 Britannia Hospital (1982) .... Painter: The Workers
 Red Monarch (1983, TV movie) .... Khrushchev
 Ordeal by Innocence (1984) .... Executioner
 The Company of Wolves (1984) .... Amorous Boy's Father
 Last of the Summer Wine (1985, sitcom) .... Oggie Buttercluff
 Doctor Who (1985, serial: Attack of the Cybermen) .... Griffiths
 Lost Empires (1986, TV mini-series) .... Tommy Beamish
 To Kill a Priest (1988) .... Judge
 All Creatures Great and Small (1989, TV series) ... Mr Dawson
 Campion (1989–1990, TV series) .... Magersfontein Lugg
 Bottom (1991, TV series) .... Mr. Rottweiler
 Kafka (1991) .... Castle Henchman
 Alien 3 (1992) .... Harold Andrews
 Leon the Pig Farmer (1992) .... Brian Chadwick
 The Bill (1993, TV series) .... Ken Farley
 Prince of Jutland (1994) .... Caedman
 Anna Lee (1994, TV series) .... Selwyn Price
 1942: A Love Story (1994) .... General Douglas
 Rumble (1995) .... Johnny Pecs
 Bob's Weekend (1996) .... The Boss
 Snow White: A Tale of Terror (1997) .... Lars
 Up 'n' Under (1998) .... Jack, Doreen's father
 Stiff Upper Lips (1998) .... Eric (final film role)

References

External links

Biography
Brian Glover at the National Portrait Gallery, London

1934 births
1997 deaths
20th-century English male actors
Actors from Barnsley
Alumni of the University of Sheffield
Burials at Brompton Cemetery
Deaths from brain cancer in England
Neurological disease deaths in England
English male film actors
English male professional wrestlers
English male television actors
Male actors from Sheffield
Male actors from Yorkshire
Sportspeople from Sheffield